Zaccheus Darko-Kelly (born May 3, 1997) is an American professional basketball player for PAOK Thessaloniki of the Greek Basket League. He played college basketball for the Montana Western Bulldogs and the University of Providence Argonauts.

High school career
Darko-Kelly played basketball for Sentinel High School in Missoula, Montana. In his senior season, he averaged 15.8 points and five rebounds per game, earning all-state honors. Darko-Kelly signed with Montana Western, the only four-year college to offer him a basketball scholarship.

College career
As a freshman at Montana Western, Darko-Kelly averaged 9.1 points and was named Frontier Freshman of the Year. He assumed a leading role in the following season. As a sophomore, he averaged 15.4 points and 6.6 rebounds per game, receiving Second Team National Association of Intercollegiate Athletics (NAIA) All-American and First Team All-Frontier honors.

For his junior season, Darko-Kelly transferred to the University of Providence after Steve Keller, his head coach at Montana Western, was hired there. He sat out for one year due to transfer rules. On February 21, 2020, Darko-Kelly recorded a career-high 40 points and 13 rebounds in a 93–76 win against Montana Western. That month, he became the first player to ever win three straight NAIA Division I National Player of the Week awards, averaging 30.8 points, 10.7 rebounds and 7.7 assists per game during that span. As a junior, Darko-Kelly averaged 22.5 points, eight rebounds, 5.7 assists, 2.3 steals and 1.4 blocks per game, surpassing the program single-season scoring record. He was selected as a First Team NAIA All-American, Frontier Player of the Year and a finalist for the Bevo Francis Award. In his senior season, Darko-Kelly led his team to Frontier regular season and tournament titles. He averaged 18.4 points, 9.4 rebounds, 5.2 assists, 1.5 steals and 1.3 blocks per game, and repeated as a First Team NAIA All-American and Frontier Player of the Year. He chose to forgo his additional year of college eligibility.

Professional career
After going undrafted in the 2021 NBA draft, Darko-Kelly joined the Toronto Raptors for the 2021 NBA Summer League.

On September 1, 2021, he signed with Riesen Ludwigsburg of the Basketball Bundesliga.

On October 5, 2021, he signed with Helsinki Seagulls of the Finnish Korisliiga.

On July 11, 2022, Darko-Kelly signed with PAOK of the Greek Basket League and the Basketball Champions League.

References

External links
University of Providence Argonauts bio
Montana Western Bulldogs bio

1997 births
Living people
American men's basketball players
American expatriate basketball people in Finland
American expatriate basketball people in Germany
American expatriate basketball people in Greece
Basketball players from Montana
College men's basketball players in the United States
Helsinki Seagulls players
P.A.O.K. BC players
Riesen Ludwigsburg players
Shooting guards
Small forwards
Sportspeople from Great Falls, Montana
University of Montana Western alumni
University of Providence alumni